Ruth Connell (born 20 April 1979) is a Scottish theatre, television and film actress, and producer. She is also a former professional dancer and choreographer. Connell is known for her recurring role as Rowena in the CW series Supernatural (2014-2020). She was nominated as "Best Leading Actress" in the 2013 Broadway World Los Angeles Awards for her portrayal of Mrs Darling and Captain Hook at the Blank Theatre, Los Angeles in their award-winning production of Peter Pan: The Boy Who Hated Mothers.

Early life

Born in Falkirk and raised outside Bonnybridge, she was the only child of football manager and coach David Connell and teacher Fiona Murray. Connell was sent to dancing lessons at an early age to keep her cousin company; she showed promise and was accepted onto the Scottish Ballets Vocational Dance Education Scheme. She performed many child roles with Scottish Ballet including the lead role of Clara in their Nutcracker. She won the titles of Scottish Junior Ballet Champion and Scottish Senior Ballet champion at Stage Festivals in Scotland as a teenager.

Career
After working as a professional dancer with companies The Curve Foundation, Jazz Art UK, and with Leah Stein at Dancebase Edinburgh, Connell attended the Rose Bruford College of Speech and Drama in London where she gained a Bachelor of Arts degree in Acting. She was picked as the "Critics Choice" by the adjudicator from The Stage newspaper for her graduation showcase. After leaving drama college, she performed the lead role of Grusha in Bertolt Brecht's The Caucasian Chalk Circle, which toured for The Palace Theatre, Watford in 2004.

Connell toured the UK in 2005 with the Oxford Stage Company's revival of Men Should Weep in the role of Isa. In 2006, she played the lead female roles of Gretchen and Helen of Troy in Faust at the Royal Lyceum Theatre, Edinburgh. The production was CATS-nominated Critics Awards for theatre in Scotland. In 2007, Connell played ballroom dancer Lily at the Citizens Theater's sell out production of Alex Norton's No Mean City and in 2008, Connell played the dual roles of Mrs. Beaver/Mrs. Mcready to glowing reviews The Lion, the Witch and the Wardrobe at The Royal Lyceum Edinburgh.

Connell was cast as a series regular in the ITV sitcom pilot Above Their Stations in 2009, which also starred Denis Lawson, Ashley Madekwe, Andrew Brooke and Simon Dudley shown on BBC Three. Connell is also credited with producing A Midsummer Night's Dream and Hansel and Gretel at the Avenue Theatre Company based in Greenwich during this time period as well as the short film Sapphire Strange and web series John and Jane.

Since moving to the United States in 2011, Connell has had lead roles in the award-winning independent film Folklore as well as in the feature films The Cursed Man, based on the cult novel by Keith Rommel, and Hara Kiri, a punk infused love story of two street skaters, directed by Aitch Alberto. She voiced Merida in the video game Disney Infinity 3.0. She reprised the role in the Sofia the First episode "The Secret Library". Since 2014 Connell has played Rowena, mother of demon Crowley (Mark A. Sheppard), in popular TV series Supernatural starting in season 10 up until its fifteenth and final Season and is one of the longest running female characters on the show.

Filmography

Film

Television

Video games

References

External links
 
 

1979 births
Living people
Scottish ballerinas
Scottish film actresses
Scottish stage actresses
Scottish television actresses
People from Bonnybridge
People from Falkirk
Alumni of Rose Bruford College
Broadway theatre people
People educated at Graeme High School